Lieutenant General Pattacheruvanda Chengappa Thimayya, PVSM, VSM, ADC is a former General Officer in the Indian Army. He was the 21st General Officer Commanding-in-Chief (GOC-in-C) Army Training Command. He assumed office on 1 November 2018 from Lt Gen Manoj Mukund Naravane.

Early life and education 
Thimayya was born in Chettalli, Virajpet, Karnataka and is the son of Pattacheruvanda Ponnappa Changappa and Gauru Changappa, Thimmaiah. He is an alumnus of Sainik School, Bhubaneswar; National Defence Academy, Pune and Indian Military Academy, Dehradun. He was a sword of honour winner at the Indian Military Academy.

Career 
Thimayya was commissioned into Mechanised Infantry Regiment in 1981. He has served on both the Western and Eastern fronts. He has commanded a mechanised infantry brigade; a strike RAPID division and X Corps (Bhatinda) (5 July 2017 – 20 July 2018). His staff appointments include Commandant of Army War College, Mhow; and Integrated Army HQ at MoD. He was promoted to Lieutenant General on 5 January 2017. He has also served as a military observer on the UN mission in Angola and as a Defence Attache to Bangladesh. He is the chief of the Mechanised Infantry Regiment.

Thimayya retired from the Army on 29 April 2020 after 39 years of service.

Personal life 
Thimayya is married to Neena Thimmaiah and they have two sons. Akshay Thimmaiah is studying Mass Communication and Arjun Thimmaiah is serving in the Indian Navy.

Military awards and aecorations

Dates of rank

References 

Living people
Indian generals
Indian Army officers
National Defence Academy (India) alumni
1960 births
People from Kodagu district
Recipients of the Param Vishisht Seva Medal
Recipients of the Vishisht Seva Medal
Indian military attachés
Commandants of Army War College, Mhow